Pingalla midgleyi is a species of fish in the family Terapontidae known by the common names black-blotch grunter and Midgley's grunter. It is endemic to the Northern Territory of Australia, where it occurs in the Alligator, Katherine, and Daly River systems. It is a resident of Kakadu National Park.

Notes

Midgley's grunter
Endemic fauna of Australia
Freshwater fish of the Northern Territory
Taxonomy articles created by Polbot
Midgley's grunter